The 1920 Case Scientists football team was an American football team that represented Case School of Applied Science (now part of Case Western Reserve University) as a member of the Ohio Athletic Conference (OAC) during the 1920 college football season. In their first year under head coach Harry H. Canfield, the team compiled a 2–8–1 record.

Schedule

References

Case
Case Western Reserve Spartans football seasons
Case Scientists football